Vicia monantha, the barn vetch, is a species of annual herb in the family Fabaceae. They are climbers and have compound, broad leaves.

Sources

References 

monantha
Flora of Malta